Andrew Brockbank is an English retired footballer. He played at left back. He lives in Penrith, Australia, where he fits air-conditioning systems.

References

Stats at Neil Brown's site
Profile at OzFootball.net
"Where Are They Now" - Blackpool F.C.'s official website

Living people
English footballers
1961 births
Blackpool F.C. players
Canberra City FC players
Runcorn F.C. Halton players
Barrow A.F.C. players
Bonnyrigg White Eagles FC players
Blacktown City FC players
English Football League players
English expatriate footballers
Expatriate soccer players in Australia
National Soccer League (Australia) players
English expatriate sportspeople in Australia
Association football defenders